Omelek Island (Marshallese: , pronounced ) is part of the Kwajalein Atoll in the Republic of the Marshall Islands. It is controlled by the United States military under a long-term lease (along with ten other islands in the atoll) and is part of the Ronald Reagan Ballistic Missile Defense Test Site.

Geography 
Geologically, it is composed of reef-rock, as are the other islands in the atoll, which is created by the accumulation of marine organism remnants (corals, Mollusca, etc.)

Rocket launches 

Omelek has long been used by the United States for small research launch vehicle launches due to its relative isolation in the South Pacific. The last U.S. government rocket launch occurred in 1996.

After 2000, the island's equatorial proximity and nearby radar tracking infrastructure attracted SpaceX, an orbital launch provider, which updated facilities on the island and established it as their primary launch location by 2006. SpaceX began launching Falcon 1 launch vehicles from Omelek in 2006. Falcon 1 Flight 4, the first successful privately funded, liquid-propelled orbital launch vehicle, was launched from Omelek Island on 28 September 2008 and was followed by another Falcon 1 launch on 13 July 2009, placing RazakSAT into orbit. This 2009 flight was the last flight of Falcon 1, and it also became the last flight of SpaceX from Omelek.

In total, SpaceX launched 5 rockets (all Falcon 1s) from Omelek between 2006 and 2009, with two successes (28 September 2008, 14 July 2009) and three (24 March 2006, 21 March 2007, 3 August 2008) failures.

Omelek was planned to host launches for the upgraded Falcon 1e rocket, but in 2011-2012, SpaceX stopped development on the Falcon 1e launches while it focused on its large Falcon 9 launch manifest.

SpaceX had tentatively planned to upgrade the launch site for use by the Falcon 9 launch vehicle. , the SpaceX launch manifest listed Omelek (Kwajalein) as a potential site for several Falcon 9 launches, the first in 2012, and the Falcon 9 Overview document offered Kwajalein as a launch option. In any event, SpaceX did not make the upgrades necessary to support Falcon 9 launches from the atoll and did not launch Falcon 9 from Omelek. The Site has since been abandoned by SpaceX.

Launches from Omelek will resume in 2022 with space startup Astra.

The Reagan Test Site, which includes rocket launch sites on other islands in the Kwajalein Atoll, on Wake Island, and at Aur Atoll, is the only U.S. government equatorial launch facility.

References

External links 

 Environmental assessment and overview of SpaceX's launch facilities at Omelek

Kwajalein Atoll
Rocket launch sites
SpaceX facilities
Islands of the Marshall Islands